Kocury  is a village in the administrative district of Gmina Dobrodzień, within Olesno County, Opole Voivodeship, in south-western Poland.

The village has a population of 140.

Geology
Late Triassic (Norian)-aged rocks forming part of the Lissauer Breccia outcrop near the village of Kocury.

References

Kocury